Mario Giordano (born 19 June 1966) is an Italian journalist and writer. He is known to be one of the most controversial journalists in the Italian right-wing media sphere and for his sensationalistic style in his television shows. He received different disciplinary sanctions for his unreliable journalistic work.

Biography
Giordano was born in Alessandria, Italy. He started his career as journalist writing for some local weekly and daily publications, as the Catholic weekly publication "Nostro tempo" in 1994, then in 1996 he moved to il Giornale as editorialist. Since 1997 he has appeared in some talk shows and debate programmes on RAI as commentator with the journalist Gad Lerner.

From 2000 to 2007 Giordano was editor in chief of Studio Aperto news program on television channel Italia 1. From 2007 to 2009 he was editor in chief of il Giornale, replacing Maurizio Belpietro. He then returned to Mediaset as director of Mediaset News (2009–10). In 2011 he moved to management of Mediaset All-News TGcom24. In 2013 he directed the "Videonews" sector. In 2014 he was appointed as director of TG4 and in 2018 he was appointed head of "Strategies and Development of Mediaset information". As a journalist, after writing for Libero, he currently writes for Belpietro's "La Verità".

Since 2018 he has led the program "Fuori dal coro" on Rete 4.

Sanctions
Mario Giordano was subject to various disciplinary sanctions by the professional order association Ordine dei Giornalisti ("Order of Journalists"), including:
In December 2008, Giordano, as director of il Giornale, «violated the regulation on the obligation of rectification, even without rectifying, even in the absence of a specific request, the information that after their dissemination has proved to be inaccurate or incorrect, especially when the error could damage individual persons, associations or communities».
In October 2009, Giordano, as director of il Giornale, «omitted the control, and therefore allowed the publication, of the counterfeit photographs appeared on il Giornale with the obvious addition of elements not originally present in the original work of the photographer».
In May 2016, Giordano and his colleague Maurizio Belpietro spread ethnic hatred against the Romani people with «xenophobe and racist intent». This is due to an article in which they accused some Romani of robbery, attributing bad characterization to the whole ethnic group. It turned out that those responsible were not Romani.

References

External links
 Articles written on il Giornale 

1966 births
Italian newspaper editors
Italian male journalists
Italian male writers
Italian Roman Catholics
Living people
People from Alessandria